Marca is a commune located in Sălaj County, Crișana, Romania. It is composed of five villages: Leșmir (Lecsmér), Marca, Marca-Huta (Bulyovszkytelep), Porț (Porc) and Șumal (Somály).

Sights 
 Wooden church of Porţ, constructed 1792

Natives 
 Eva Mozes Kor, activist and Holocaust survivor from Porț

References

Communes in Sălaj County
Localities in Crișana